The Senior Australian of the Year Award commenced in 1999, in the International Year of Older Persons, and recognises those Australians aged 60 and over who continue to achieve and contribute. 2002 is the only year, since the founding of the awards, that a recipient hasn't been certified.

See also
 List of Australian of the Year Award recipients
 List of Young Australian of the Year Award recipients
 List of Australian Local Hero Award recipients

References

Lists of Australian award winners
Old age in Australia